Sorry, Wrong Number is a 1958 Australian television play based on Lucille Fletcher's radio play Sorry, Wrong Number. It starred Georgie Sterling.

Plot
The bed-ridden Mrs Stevenson hears on a  telephone, due to crossed wires, that a murder is being plotted to occur tonight. She calls various people in a desperate attempt to get someone to believe her story. As the night goes on, she becomes increasingly concerned that the victim may be someone she knows.

Cast
Georgie Sterling as Mrs Stevenson
Del Furze
Derani Scarr
Pat Binstead
Bonnie Walker
John Llewelyn
John Bluthal
Al Garcia
Wayne Polzin
Dorothy Whiteley
Eric Reiman

Production

Sterling had performed in the play on radio in 1948.

Ray Menmuir directed. Menmuir had only just finished directing Murder Story for the ABC.

Follow Up
The ABC subsequently broadcast another one person play on television, Box for One.

References

1958 television plays
1950s Australian television plays
Telephony in popular culture